Mohamed Boumerdassi, (March 18, 1936, in Ouled Boumerdès –  December 7, 2010, in Thénia) was considered a Grand Master of Bedouin music, Malhun and Algerian music.

Life
He was born on March 18, 1936, under the name Mohamed ben Mustapha al-Boumerdassi in the Ouled Boumerdès village within the actual Boumerdès Province.

He received his basic education at the Zawiyet Sidi Boumerdassi in his native village of Ouled Boumerdès, where he learned the Quran.

He was a keen admirer of Sheikh Ben Ahmed al-Boumerdassi, then known for his qasida of madih nabawi and poetry praising Muhammad.

He was also a follower of Sheikh al-Miliani, who appointed him Commander of Bedouin Song (machiakha) after discovering his voice which he greatly admired.

He was notably renowned for his song Hammam Alouane and a tribute was paid to him in 2004 by the Algerian Minister of Culture for the "National festival of Bedouin song and popular poetry".

He died on Tuesday evening, December 7, 2010, at the age of 74 years at his home located on the Yahia Boushaki Boulevard in Thénia and was buried the next day in the Bourouiche cemetery north of the same city.

A large audience represented by the friends of the deceased, his family and representatives of the Ministry of Culture and the authorities of the Boumerdès Province, accompanied Sheikh al-Boumerdassi to his last home.

Songs
 Hammam Alouane

See also
 List of Algerian musicians
 Bedouin music
 Malhun
 Music of Algeria
 Culture of Algeria
 Zawiyet Sidi Boumerdassi

References

External links
 
 
 
 
 

1936 births
People from Thénia
People from Thénia District
People from Boumerdès Province
Kabyle people
Boumerdassi family
2010 deaths
20th-century Algerian male singers
Bedouin music
Algerian flautists
Berber musicians
21st-century Algerian people
20th-century flautists